The 2015 Nigeria Women Premier League is the 25th season of women's association football in Nigeria, and the second season since the re-branding of the competition from a championship to a premier league. The league started in May 2015, and the regular season was concluded by September of the same year. Rivers Angels came to the season as defending champions after winning the 2014 edition. They successfully defended the title by defeating Bayelsa Queens by a lone goal from Osinachi Ohale in the super six final in Umuahia, Abia State. The super six tournament began on October 20 and was concluded November 5, 2015.

League standings

Group A

Group B

Super six tournament 
The super six tournament was hosted by Abia State government in Umuahia Township Stadium. Rivers Angels, Delta Queens, Nasarawa Amazons, Confluence Queens, Bayelsa Queens and Sunshine Queens qualified by being part of the top three teams in group A and B. Rivers Angels qualified for the final by defeating both Nasarawa Amazons and Sunshine Queens by a lone goal. However, the second finalist, Bayelsa Queens drew their first game against Delta Queens but went on to defeat Confluence Queens by four goals to one. This was the same number of points recorded by fellow pool member, Delta Queens but Bayelsa edged their regional rivals for the finals on superior goal difference. However, Delta Queens were able to qualify for the loser's final by defeating Confluence Queens by two goals to one in their second game.

Preliminaries

Pool A

Pool B

Third place

Final

Top scorers 
 Rofiat Sule (Bayelsa Queens) - 11 goals
 Precious Edewor (Osun Babes) - 8 goals

References

External links 
 RSSF data
 Week 2 data
 Week 4 data
 Week 13 data

Nigeria Women Premier League seasons
Wom
Wom
Ni
Ni